Fiber type may refer to:

Fiber (disambiguation)
Axon
Skeletal muscle